HMS Basilisk was a first-class paddle sloop of the Royal Navy, built at the Woolwich Dockyard and launched on 22 August 1848.

Design and construction 
Basilisk was designed by Oliver Lang to the same lines as the screw sloop Niger and ordered on 23 March 1846 from Woolwich Dockyard. She was laid down in November of the same year and launched on 22 August 1848.

Propulsion 
She was fitted with paddlewheels driven by a Miller, Ravenhill & Salkeld two-cylinder oscillating steam engine rated at 400 nominal horsepower and developing .

Armament 
Basilisk was fitted with a single 68-pounder (95 cwt) smoothbore muzzle-loading gun on a pivot mount, a single 10-inch (84 cwt) shell gun and four 32-pounder (42 cwt) smoothbore muzzle-loading guns on truck mountings.

Propulsion trials 

She participated in 1849 in trials in the English Channel with the screw sloop Niger. Basilisk had started life as her sister ship when both were designed as sailing sloops, but while Niger received screw propulsion, Basilisk was fitted with paddles. Although previous trials, including a similar comparison between Rattler and Alecto in 1845, had shown that screw propulsion was broadly superior, the 1849 trials pitted two near-identical ships against each other. Since both ships had the same lines and steam engines developing almost identical power, the results confirmed the superiority of screw propulsion over the paddle-wheel once and for all. On 7 April 1853, Basilisk ran aground off Southsea, Hampshire due to a flag being hoisted showing it was safe to enter Portsmouth Naval Base when there was insufficient water to do so. Two or three of her crew were injured. She was later refloated and taken in to Portsmouth.

Crimean War service 
After the trials she served in the Baltic Sea during the Crimean War in 1854–1855, participating in the blockade of Courland. She attacked and sank 10 Russian transports carrying grain on 14 June 1855 and sank some salt boats on 13 July. She also participated in the action of 17 July in the Gulf of Riga, with  against Russian gunboats and shore batteries.

Foreign service 
After the Crimean War, she served on the North America and West Indies Station and afterwards on the China Station and in Japan. On 27 July 1868, she was driven ashore on the coast of China. Repairs cost £1,777. In March 1871 she commenced service on the Australia Station. The Basilisk under Captain John Moresby visited the Ellice Islands in July 1872.

She undertook hydrographic surveys around New Guinea with Captain Moresby and made a number of discoveries. She was later used for anti-blackbirding operations in the South Pacific.

She left the Australia Station in 1874 and returned to England.

Fate 
Basilisk was paid off and broken up at Chatham in 1882.

Notes

Citations

References 
Bastock, John (1988), Ships on the Australia Station, Child & Associates Publishing Pty Ltd; Frenchs Forest, Australia. 

1848 ships
Ships built in Woolwich
Victorian-era sloops of the United Kingdom
Paddle sloops of the Royal Navy
Crimean War naval ships of the United Kingdom
Maritime incidents in April 1853
Maritime incidents in July 1868